Abu Qurayn or Abu Grein  ( ʾAbū Qurayn), also known as El Hisha El Jadida ( Al-Hīšaẗ al-Jadīdah), is a village in Libya. It is located 118 km south of Misrata, and 138 km west of Sirte. It is on the cross-roads between the Libyan Coastal Highway and the Fezzan road.

Notes

Populated places in Sirte District
Villages in Libya